The 2016 Pan American Road Cycling Championships took place at San Cristóbal, Táchira, Venezuela, May 19–22, 2016.

Medal summary

Men

Women

Under 23 Men

Results

Men elite road race

Men elite individual time trial

Women's road race

Women's time trial

Under 23 Men road race

Under 23 Men time trial

Controversies
Both Cycling Canada and USA Cycling decided not to attend to the Pan American Championships despite the impact on the 2016 World Championships and the Cycling at the 2016 Summer Olympics due to the ongoing Venezuelan unrest, citing "security concerns". The location of the championships requires flying to Cúcuta, Colombia then taking ground transportation to Táchira, having the border an ongoing increased violence advice from the Canadian and American governments. Earlier in the year, during the 2016 Vuelta al Táchira, riders and technical personnel from Italy suffered the robbery from personal belongings and Venezuelan rider Carlos Castro had his bike robbed.

After spending from 13 May to 17 stranded in the Colombian border, cyclists and technical personnel from Chile could finally manage to go through and arrived at San Cristóbal, Táchira on Tuesday 17 May. The Colombian customs authorities denied the passing of goods, but the delegations from Costa Rica, Brazil and Chile were halted in the border and had their practices affected.

During the inaugural session of the championships, protestors demanded in the streets of Rubio were the time trials started, that the National Electoral Council concede the revocatory referendum against Venezuelan President Nicolás Maduro.

References

Americas
Cycling
Pan American Road and Track Championships
International cycle races hosted by Venezuela